Osvaldo Cavandoli (1 January 1920 – 3 March 2007), also known by his pen name Cava, was an Italian cartoonist. His most famous work is his series of short animated cartoons, La Linea ("The Line").

Early life, family and education
Cavandoli was born in Maderno sul Garda, Italy, on the shores of Lake Garda. He and his family moved to Milan when he was two years old. (He was later made an honorary citizen of the city.)

Career
From 1936 to 1940, he worked as a technical designer for Alfa Romeo. When he developed his interest in cartoons in 1943, he started working with Nino Pagot, who later created Calimero. In 1950 he started working independently as a director and a producer.

La Linea
Cavandoli enjoyed worldwide recognition in 1969 with his character La Linea, a simply drawn cartoon born and lived out of a single white pencil stroke. Cavandoli initially proposed his work for Carosello, an Italian advertisement break broadcast between 1957 and 1977.  Massimo Lagostina, the owner of a popular eponymous brand of cookware, chose it as a testimonial for his advertising campaign. Following the success of the commercial, La Linea became the protagonist of an animated series subsequently adopted in many European countries.

Personal life and death
Cavandoli died in Milan, Italy,  at age 87.

References

1920 births
2007 deaths
Italian animators
Italian animated film directors
Italian animated film producers
Italian cartoonists